The 2020 Hastings Deering Colts season was the 3rd season of the under-20 competition, sponsored by Hastings Deering and run by the Queensland Rugby League. The draw and structure of the competition mirrors that of its senior counterpart, the Queensland Cup. 

The Sunshine Coast Falcons are the defending premiers.

Teams
In 2020, the lineup of teams remained unchanged for the second consecutive year.

Ladder

References

2020 in Australian rugby league